Andrey Kuznetsov and Adrián Menéndez-Maceiras were the defending champions, but they did not participate this year.

Andrej Martin and Hans Podlipnik-Castillo won the title, defeating Roman Jebavý and Jan Šátral in the final, 4–6, 7–5, [10–1].

Seeds

Draw

References
 Main Draw

Prosperita Open - Doubles